Godhead (or godhood) refers to the essence or substance (ousia) of God in Christianity — God the Father, Son, and Holy Spirit.

Appearance in English Bibles
John Wycliffe introduced the term godhede into English Bible versions in two places, and, though somewhat archaic, the term survives in modern English because of its use in three places of the Tyndale New Testament (1525), the Geneva Bible (1560/1599), and King James Version (1611). In that translation, the word was used to translate three different Koine Greek words:

See also
 God in Christianity
 Godhead in Judaism
 Trinity

References

Christian terminology
God in Christianity
Trinitarianism
Conceptions of God
Nature of Jesus Christ